The 1964 Baylor Bears football team represented Baylor University in the Southwest Conference (SWC) during the 1964 NCAA University Division football season. In their sixth season under head coach John Bridgers, the Bears compiled a 5–5 record (4–3 against conference opponents), finished in third place in the conference, and were outscored by opponents by a combined total of 176 to 162. They played their home games at Baylor Stadium in Waco, Texas.

The team's statistical leaders included Terry Southall with 1,623 passing yards, Tom Davies with 401 rushing yards, and Larry Elkins with 851 receiving yards and 42 points scored. Bobby R. Maples and James W. Rust were the team captains.

Schedule

References

Baylor
Baylor Bears football seasons
Baylor Bears football